Daniel Rudolph Yakopo (born 29 June 1988), known as “Dan”, is an Australian rugby union player. He played for the n sevens team and made his debut at the 2010 England Sevens where Australia defeated  in the final 19-14. Yakopo returned from injury to play at the 2012 Wellington Sevens. He is currently coach of the Carey Baptist Grammar School First XV, who won the premiership in 2016.

Yakopo played for the Parramatta Two Blues in the Shute Shield. He previously played for the Tuggeranong Vikings.

His father is Rotuman from Malhaha. He has four siblings; three sisters and a brother.

Yakopo is also the co-founder of emerging Australasian sports supplies and medical brand Vosota Med, together with his cousin Tomu Mataika.

References

External links
 
ESPN Scrum Profile

1988 births
Living people
Australian rugby union players
Australia international rugby sevens players
Australian people of Rotuman descent
Australian people of Fijian descent